There have been 18 baronetcies created for persons with the surname Campbell, six in the Baronetage of Nova Scotia and twelve in the Baronetage of the United Kingdom.

Campbell baronets, of Glenorchy (1625)
The Campbell baronetcy, of Glenorchy in the County of Perth, was created in the Baronetage of Nova Scotia on 29 May 1625 for Duncan Campbell. Known as "Black Duncan", he had earlier represented Argyll in the Scottish Parliament. Campbell was a descendant of Sir Colin Campbell, 1st of Glenorchy, younger son of Duncan Campbell, 1st Lord Campbell, ancestor of the Dukes of Argyll. The third and fourth Baronets were also members of the Scottish Parliament for Argyll. The fifth Baronet was created Earl of Breadalbane and Holland in 1681. See also the Campbell Baronetcy of St Cross Mede below.

Sir Duncan Campbell, 1st Baronet (–1631)
Sir Colin Campbell, 2nd Baronet (c. 1577–1640)
Sir Robert Campbell, 3rd Baronet (c. 1580- c. 1650)
Sir John Campbell, 4th Baronet (c. 1615-c. 1670)
Sir John Campbell, 5th Baronet (1635–1717) (created Earl of Breadalbane and Holland in 1681)
For further succession see Earl of Breadalbane and Holland

Campbell baronets, of Lundy (or Lundie) (1627)
The Campbell baronetcy, of Lundy (or Lundie) in the County of Forfar, was created in the Baronetage of Nova Scotia on 13 December 1627 for Colin Campbell. He was the son of Colin Campbell of Lundie, younger son of Colin Campbell, 6th Earl of Argyll. The title became dormant on the death of the second Baronet in c. 1696. The title is later believed to have been vested in Archibald Campbell, 1st Duke of Argyll, and his descendants. However, as of 2010 the title does not appear on the Official Roll of the Baronetage. For more information, follow this link.

Sir Colin Campbell, 1st Baronet (died c. 1650)
Sir Colin Campbell, 2nd Baronet (died c. 1696) (dormant)
Archibald Campbell, 1st Duke of Argyll, 3rd Baronet (1658–1703)
For further succession see Duke of Argyll

Campbell baronets, of Auchinbreck (1628)

The Campbell baronetcy, of Auchinbreck in the County of Argyll, was created in the Baronetage of Nova Scotia on 24 January 1628 for Sir Dugald Campbell. He was a descendant of Duncan Campbell of Kilmichael, younger son of Duncan Campbell, 1st Lord Campbell, ancestor of the Dukes of Argyll. The fifth Baronet was one of the Scottish representatives to the 1st Parliament of Great Britain.

Sir Dugald Campbell, 1st Baronet (c. 1570–1641)
Sir Duncan Campbell, 2nd Baronet (died 1645)
Sir Dugald Campbell, 3rd Baronet (died c. 1661)
Sir Duncan Campbell, 4th Baronet (died c. 1700)
Sir James Campbell, 5th Baronet (c. 1679–1756)
Sir James Campbell, 6th Baronet (died 1814)
Sir Jean Baptiste Guillaume Édouard Charles Campbell, 7th Baronet (1769–1847)
Sir John Eyton Campbell, 8th Baronet (1809–1853)
Sir Louis Henry Dugald Campbell, 9th Baronet (1844–1875)
Sir Norman Montgomery Abercrombie Campbell, 10th Baronet (1846–1901)
Sir Charles Ralph Campbell, 11th Baronet (1850–1919)
Sir Charles Ralph Campbell, 12th Baronet (1881–1948)
Sir Norman Dugald Ferrier Campbell, 13th Baronet (1883–1968)
Sir Louis Hamilton Campbell, 14th Baronet (1885–1970)
Sir Robin Auchinbreck Campbell, 15th Baronet (1922–2016)
Sir Louis Auchinbreck Campbell, 16th Baronet (born 1953)

Campbell baronets, of Ardnamurchan and Airds; First creation (1628)
The Campbell baronetcy, of Ardnamurchan and Airds in the County of Argyll, was created in the Baronetage of Nova Scotia on 23 December 1628 for Donald Campbell. He resigned his dignity into the King's hands on 28 August 1643 for a new enrollment of it and the lands annexed in favour of his nephew and heirs male. Upon Donald's death, his nephew, George (son of Sir John Campbell of Calder), did not claim the title, nor did the next succeeding three heirs, John (3rd), father of Alexander Campbell (4th), married to his cousin Jean Campbell (daughter of Sir John Campbell of Glenorchy, 4th Baronet, and third wife Christian Muschet), parents of Donald Campbell (5th), married to Margaret Maclaine, parents of John Campbell, married to his cousin Jane Campbell. But about 1790 John Campbell, great-great-grandson of George, resumed the title as 6th Baronet being followed in turn by his son John Campbell, Lieutenant Governor of St Vincent 1845–1853. His son, Major-General John William Campbell's claim to be placed on the Official Roll of the Standing Council of the Baronetage (itself created 1898) in right of the 1628 creation was not recognised but a new baronetcy was conferred upon him in November 1913 with special precedence (see below).

Sir Donald Campbell, 1st Baronet (died 1651)

Campbell baronets, of Aberuchil (c. 1668)

The Campbell baronetcy, of Aberuchil in the County of Perth, was created in the Baronetage of Nova Scotia in c. 1668 for Colin Campbell.
Sir Colin Campbell, 1st Baronet (died 1704)
Sir James Campbell, 2nd Baronet (c. 1672–1754)
Sir James Campbell, 3rd Baronet (1723–1812)
Sir Alexander Campbell, 4th Baronet (1757–1824)
Sir James Campbell, 5th Baronet (1818–1903)
Sir Alexander Campbell, 6th Baronet (1841–1914)
Sir John Alexander Coldstream Campbell, 7th Baronet (1877–1960)
Sir Colin Moffat Campbell, 8th Baronet (1925–1997)
Sir James Alexander Moffat Bain Campbell, 9th Baronet (born 1956)

The heir apparent to the baronetcy is Colin George Denman Bain Campbell of Aberuchill, the Younger, (born 1999).

Campbell baronets, of Ardkinglass (1679)
The Campbell baronetcy, of Ardkinglass in the County of Argyll, was created in the Baronetage of Nova Scotia on 23 March 1679 for Colin Campbell. His son, the second Baronet, represented several constituencies in the British House of Commons. The title became extinct on the latter's death in 1752.

Sir Colin Campbell, 1st Baronet (c. 1640–1709)
Sir James Campbell, 2nd Baronet (c. 1666–1752)

Livingston (later Campbell) baronets, of Glentirran (1685)

The Livingston (later Campbell) baronetcy, of Glentirran in the County of Stirling, was created in the Baronetage of Nova Scotia on 20 July 1685 for Alexander Livingston. The third Baronet assumed the surname of Campbell in lieu of Livingston. He sat as Member of Parliament for Stirlingshire. The title became either extinct or dormant on the death of the fourth Baronet in 1810.

Sir Alexander Livingston, 1st Baronet (died 1698)
Sir James Livingston, 2nd Baronet (died 1771)
Sir James Campbell, 3rd Baronet (c. 1719–1788)
Sir Alexander Campbell, 4th Baronet (died 1810)

Campbell baronets, of Succoth (1808)
The Campbell baronetcy, of Succoth in the County of Dumbarton, was created in the Baronetage of the United Kingdom on 17 September 1808 for Ilay Campbell, Lord President of the Court of Session and Lord Justice General between 1789 and 1808 under the judicial title Lord Succoth. The second Baronet was a Senator of the College of Justice, also under the judicial title Lord Succoth. The third Baronet sat as Member of Parliament for Argyllshire.

John Campbell, son of the second Baronet and father of the third and fourth Baronets, sat as Member of Parliament for Dunbartonshire. The title became extinct on the death of the seventh Baronet in 2017.

Sir Ilay Campbell, 1st Baronet (1734–1823)
Sir Archibald Campbell, 2nd Baronet (1769–1846)
Sir Archibald Islay Campbell, 3rd Baronet (1825–1866)
Sir George Campbell, 4th Baronet (1829–1874)
Sir Archibald Spencer Lindsey Campbell, 5th Baronet (1852–1941)
Sir George Ilay Campbell, 6th Baronet (1894–1967)
Sir Ilay Mark Campbell, 7th Baronet (1927–2017)

Campbell (later Cockburn-Campbell) baronets, of Gartsford (1815/1821)
The Campbell (later Cockburn-Campbell) baronetcy of Gartsford in the County of Ross, was created in the Baronetage of the United Kingdom on 3 July 1821. For more information on this creation, see Cockburn-Campbell baronets.

Campbell baronets, (1815)
The Campbell baronetcy, was created in the Baronetage of the United Kingdom on 22 May 1815 for the soldier Guy Campbell. The title was in honour of his father, Lieutenant-General Colin Campbell, Governor of Gibraltar, and was created with remainder to the heirs male of his father. Colin Campbell was the son of John Campbell, Deputy Keeper of the Great Seal of Scotland, son of the Hon. Colin Campbell of Ardmaddy, youngest son of John Campbell, 1st Earl of Breadalbane and Holland (see above).

Sir Ronald Campbell, second son of the third Baronet, was a diplomat.

Sir Guy Campbell, 1st Baronet (died 1849)
Sir Edward Fitzgerald Campbell, 2nd Baronet (1822–1882)
Sir Guy Theophilus Campbell, 3rd Baronet (1854–1931)
Sir Guy Colin Campbell, 4th Baronet (1885–1960)
Sir Guy Theophilus Halswell Campbell, 5th Baronet (1910–1993)
Sir Lachlan Philip Kemeys Campbell, 6th Baronet (born 1958)

The heir apparent is Archibald Edward Fitzgerald Campbell (born 1990)

Campbell baronets, of Inverneil (1818)

The Campbell baronetcy, of Invernail in the County of Argyll, was created in the Baronetage of the United Kingdom on 4 December 1818 for James Campbell. The title became extinct on his death in 1819.

Sir James Campbell, 1st Baronet (died 1819)

Campbell baronets, of New Brunswick (1831)

The Campbell baronetcy, of New Brunswick, was created in the Baronetage of the United Kingdom on 30 September 1831 for Archibald Campbell, Lieutenant Governor of New Brunswick. The title became extinct on the death of the fifth Baronet in 1949.

Sir Archibald Campbell, 1st Baronet (1769–1843)
Sir John Campbell, 2nd Baronet (1807–1855) 
Sir Archibald Ava Campbell, 3rd Baronet (1844–1913) 
Sir Archibald Augustus Ava Campbell, 4th Baronet (1879–1916) Killed in action during the First World War as a lieutenant in the 8th Cameron Highlanders at Hohenzollern Redoubt, 10 May 1916.
Sir William Andrewes Ava Campbell, 5th Baronet (1880–1949)

Campbell baronets, of Carrick Buoy (1831)
The Campbell baronetcy, of Carrick Buoy in the County of Donegal, was created in the Baronetage of the United Kingdom on 30 September 1831 for Robert Campbell. The title became extinct on the death of the fourth Baronet in 1900.

Sir Robert Campbell, 1st Baronet (1771–1858)
Sir John Nicholl Robert Campbell, 2nd Baronet (1799–1870)
Sir Gilbert Edward Campbell, 3rd Baronet (1838-c. 1899)
Sir Claude Robert Campbell, 4th Baronet (1871–1900)

Campbell baronets, of Barcaldine (or Barcaldyne) and of Glenure (1831)

The Campbell baronetcy, of Barcaldine (or Barcaldyne) in the County of Argyll and of Glenure, was created in the Baronetage of the United Kingdom on 30 September 1831 for the soldier Duncan Campbell. His third son, John Peter William Campbell (1824–1901), was a Major-General in the Bengal Staff Corps.
Sir Duncan Campbell, 1st Baronet (1786–1842)
Sir Alexander Campbell, 2nd Baronet (1819–1880)
Sir Duncan Alexander Dundas Campbell, 3rd Baronet (1856–1926)
Sir Alexander William Dennistoun Campbell, 4th Baronet (1848–1931)
Sir Duncan John Alfred Campbell, 5th Baronet (1854–1932)
Sir Eric Francis Dennistoun Campbell, 6th Baronet (1892–1963)
Sir Ian Vincent Hamilton Campbell, 7th Baronet (1895–1978)
Sir Niall Alexander Hamilton Campbell, 8th Baronet (1925–2003)
Sir Roderick Duncan Cameron Campbell, 9th Baronet (born 1961) 

The heir presumptive to the baronetcy is Angus Charles Dundas Campbell (born 1967), 2nd and youngest son of the 8th Baronet and brother of the current Baronet.

Campbell baronets, of Dunstaffnage (1836)
The Campbell baronetcy, of Dunstaffnage in the County of Argyll, was created in the Baronetage of the United Kingdom on 11 March 1836 for Donald Campbell, subsequently Lieutenant Governor of Prince Edward Island. The title became extinct on the death of the third Baronet in 1879.

Sir Donald Campbell, 1st Baronet (1800–1850)
Sir Angus Campbell, 2nd Baronet (1827–1863)
Sir Donald Campbell, 3rd Baronet (1829–1879)

Campbell baronets, of Blythswood (1880)
The Campbell baronetcy, of Blythswood in the County of Renfrew, was created in the Baronetage of the United Kingdom on 4 May 1880. For more information on this creation, see Baron Blythswood.

Campbell baronets, of Ardnamurchan; Second creation (1913)
The Campbell baronetcy, of Ardnamurchan in the County of Argyll, was created in the Baronetage of the United Kingdom on 29 November 1913, with precedency of 1804, for the soldier John Campbell. see the 1628 creation above for earlier history of the family. The second Baronet died in 1943 while a prisoner in Palenbang Camp, Sumatra. The title is believed to have become either extinct or dormant on his death. His son and heir, Bruce Colin Patrick Campbell, disappeared in London shortly after his father's death and was never heard from again. It is not known if he had children.

Sir John William Campbell, 1st Baronet (1836–1915)
Sir John Bruce Stuart Campbell, 2nd Baronet (1877–1943)
Sir Bruce Colin Patrick Campbell, 3rd Baronet (1904–1943?)

Campbell baronets, of Milltown (1917)
The Campbell baronetcy, of Milltown in the County of Dublin, was created in the Baronetage of the United Kingdom on 10 January 1917. For more information on this creation, see Baron Glenavy.

Campbell baronets, of Airds (1939)
The Campbell baronetcy, of Airds in the County of Argyll, was created in the Baronetage of the United Kingdom on 3 July 1939 for the Conservative politician Edward Campbell. The title became extinct on the death of the second Baronet in 1954.

Sir Edward Taswell Campbell, 1st Baronet (1879–1945)
Sir Charles Duncan Macnair Campbell, 2nd Baronet (1906–1954)

See also
Clan Campbell
Campbell-Orde baronets
Cockburn-Campbell baronets
Home-Purves-Hume-Campbell baronets

References

Baronetcies in the Baronetage of Nova Scotia
Extinct baronetcies in the Baronetage of Nova Scotia
Baronetcies in the Baronetage of the United Kingdom
Extinct baronetcies in the Baronetage of the United Kingdom
1625 establishments in Nova Scotia
1808 establishments in the United Kingdom
Baronetcies created with special remainders